Paralepistopsis acromelalga is a basidiomycete fungus in the Tricholomataceae family. It was formerly classified as Clitocybe acromelalga.

Taxonomy 
It was first described in 1918 by the mycologist T. Ichimura and classified as Clitocybe acromelalga.

The Paralepistopsis genus was created in 2012 by the Italian mycologist Alfredo Vizzini to better classify two rare toxic species formerly located in the Clitocybe genus and this species was subsequently reclassified.

Habitat and distribution 
It has been found in Japan and South Korea.

Toxicity 
It was discovered to be poisonous in 1918, when symptoms of mushroom poisoning occurred within three days of consumption. It had been mistaken for the edible tawny funnel cap (Paralepista flaccida formerly Lepista flaccida).

Consumption of a related species, Paralepistopsis amoenolens, from France has resulted in the same condition.

That species is commonly known as the paralysis cap and has been shown to contain acromelic acids including acromelic acid A which is a potent neurotoxin with a chemical formula of C13H14N2O7 and is associated with causing paralysis and seizures

References

Tricholomataceae
Paralepistopsis
Poisonous fungi
Fungi of Asia